My Family and Other Animals is a 2005 television film written by Simon Nye and directed by Sheree Folkson. The film is based on the 1956 autobiographical book of the same title written by Gerald Durrell, in which he describes a series of anecdotes relating to his family's stay on Corfu from 1935–1939, when he was aged 10–14.

Plot 

My Family and Other Animals tells the story of the Durrell family, Lawrence Durrell, Leslie Durrell, Margaret Durrell and Gerald Durrell, as well as their mother Louisa Durrell, as they spend five years (1935–1939) on the Greek island of Corfu. The family reside in a series of villas, and spend their time indulging in their varying interests. Gerald develops his passion for wildlife, his mother spends her time cooking and worrying about everyone else; Larry writes and annoys the entire family with high-brow guests and unhelpful suggestions; Leslie develops his passion for ballistics and sailing, whilst Margo sunbathes and enchants the local young men.

Cast 
 Eugene Simon as Gerald Durrell
 Imelda Staunton as Louisa Durrell
 Chris Langham as Theodore Stephanides
 Omid Djalili as Spiro
 Matthew Goode as Larry Durrell
 Russell Tovey as Leslie Durrell
 Tamzin Merchant as Margo Durrell
 Alexander Armstrong as Narrator/Adult Gerry (voiceover)

See also
 Gerald Durrell's Corfu trilogy books:
My Family and Other Animals (1956)
 Birds, Beasts, and Relatives (1969)
 The Garden of the Gods (1978)
 My Family and Other Animals (1987), a BBC 10-episode TV series based on Gerald Durrell's book by the same name
 The Durrells (2016), an ITV drama television series loosely based on the Corfu trilogy

References

External links 
 
 PBS Masterpiece Theatre: My family and other animals: Production Notes

2005 television films
2005 films
British television films
Films based on British novels
Films scored by Nicholas Hooper
Films shot in Corfu
Films directed by Sheree Folkson